Pseudanilara is a genus of beetles in the family Buprestidae, containing the following species:

 Pseudanilara achardi (Obenberger, 1923)
 Pseudanilara bicolor Carter, 1924
 Pseudanilara cupripes (Macleay, 1872)
 Pseudanilara dubia Carter, 1926
 Pseudanilara kerremansi (Obenberger, 1928)
 Pseudanilara microphaenops (Obenberger, 1928)
 Pseudanilara occidentalis Carter, 1924
 Pseudanilara occidentris (Obenberger, 1924)
 Pseudanilara piliventris Catrer, 1926
 Pseudanilara pilosa (Carter, 1913)
 Pseudanilara purpureicollis (Macleay, 1872)

References

Buprestidae genera